HardwareX is a peer-reviewed open access scientific journal dedicated to the open source design and construction of scientific instrumentation. The journal publishes science hardware shared under an  open source hardware license. Published articles include science hardware over a broad range of scientific disciplines, from life science and engineering research, to ecological and environmental monitoring, to digital manufacturing (e.g. 3D printing), to educational tools. It popularizes the ideas of open-source hardware and open science.

References

External links 
 
 HardwareX Frequently Asked Questions

Publications established in 2017
Elsevier academic journals
English-language journals
Open-source hardware